Boston Duets is an album by American jazz saxophonist Oliver Lake and pianist Donal Fox, which was recorded live in 1989 and released on the Music & Arts label.

Reception

In his review for AllMusic, Thom Jurek states "What is happening on the bandstand between these two is extemporaneous composition and deep listening."

The Penguin Guide to Jazz notes "The pianist is a restless and highly intelligent improviser who also works in more formal structures, and it's easy to hear why the two men found the partnership congenial."

Track listing
 "Comous" (Lake) – 8:04
 "Seque Blues" (Fox, Lake) – 10:13
 "Sarah" (Lake) – 2:41
 "Suite in Three Movements" (Fox) – 14:53
 "Intermezzo" (Fox) – 2:30
 "Variants on a Theme by Monk" (Fox) – 7:13
 "Ballad" (Lake) – 3:19
 "No V.T." (Lake) – 11:43
 "Rhythm-a-Ning" (Thelonious Monk) – 6:54

Personnel
Oliver Lake - alto saxophone, soprano saxophone, flute
Donal Fox – piano

References

 
1992 live albums
Oliver Lake live albums
Music & Arts live albums